Toonami (a portmanteau of the words cartoon and tsunami) was a former programming block on Cartoon Network that ran from 7 July 2001 until 4 August 2006.

History
Toonami was launched on Cartoon Network Australia on 7 July 2001 as an outlet for action animation. Most of its lineup consisted of anime, including already popular shows such as Dragon Ball Z, as well as the Australian premiere of Cardcaptors and exclusives such as Mobile Suit Gundam Wing and YuYu Hakusho. Occasionally it also broadcast action cartoons from the United States such as Batman Beyond.

On its launch, Toonami broadcast on Saturday evenings from 6:00 pm to 8:00 pm and on Sunday afternoons from 3:00 pm to 5:00 pm. Each day's programming was repeated in the Toonami "Late Run" from 11:00 pm to 1:00 am. Toonami soon expanded to weekdays, and for a number of years could be seen seven days a week. Although time-slots varied, the main Toonami block remained on weekday afternoons; in 2005 it was airing weeknights from 6.00 pm, with mini-marathons playing on Saturday and Sunday mornings. 

In August 2006, Toonami was dropped from the Cartoon Network schedule. Former Toonami programming, and new programming that would have previously gone to Toonami is now spread out across the network's other time-slots.

References

External links

Television programming blocks in Australia
Toonami
Television channels and stations established in 2001
Television channels and stations disestablished in 2006
2001 establishments in Australia
2006 disestablishments in Australia